Rockin' in Rhythm is a jazz album by alto saxophonist Sonny Criss recorded in 1968 and released on the Prestige label.

Reception

AllMusic awarded the album 4 stars with its review by Jim Todd stating, "This highly compatible group of like-minded masters is well-served by a recording that puts the listener in the middle of their tight-knit sound... Anyone hearing Criss for the first time via this CD will feel compelled to dig deeper into his discography."

Track listing
 "Eleanor Rigby" (John Lennon, Paul McCartney) – 5:32   
 "When the Sun Comes Out" (Harold Arlen, Ted Koehler) – 6:31   
 "Sonnymoon for Two" (Sonny Rollins) – 4:50   
 "Rockin' in Rhythm" (Harry Carney, Duke Ellington, Irving Mills) – 4:37   
 "Misty Roses" (Tim Hardin) – 5:53   
 "(I'm Afraid) The Masquerade Is Over" (Herb Magidson, Allie Wrubel) – 5:47   
 "All the Things You Are" (Oscar Hammerstein II, Jerome Kern) – 5:52 Bonus track on CD reissue

Personnel
Sonny Criss – alto saxophone
Eddie Green – piano
Bob Cranshaw – bass
Alan Dawson – drums

References

Sonny Criss albums
Prestige Records albums
1969 albums
Albums produced by Don Schlitten